Zetes Industries S.A. / N.V. (Zetes Group) is a Belgian technology company headquartered in Brussels with operations in Europe, Africa and the Middle East, employing more than 1 200 people in 22 countries.

Zetes provides IT solutions for supply chain optimization and citizen identification solutions.

The company's highest profile projects include the Belgian ID cards, drivers licenses and passports. The company also makes the Portuguese ID card, the Ivorian passport and Gambia's biometric passport.

In 2017 Zetes became a subsidiary of the Panasonic Corporation, integrating the connected solutions business unit for Public Safety and Security, Logistics, Manufacture and Retail.

Business divisions

Goods identification

Zetes develops and implements automatic identification and data capture systems for different steps in the supply chain: manufacturing, warehousing, transport, logistics and retail. Zetes’ implementations are based on automatic ID technologies: bar codes, RFID, printing, print & apply, voice recognition, image ID. There are specialist solutions for pharmaceuticals and tobacco companies.

People identification

Zetes delivers secure people authentication solutions to governments, administrative units and public institutions, based on technologies: biometrics, AFIS and smart cards. 
People authentication is used in the areas of people registration, secure document production and personalization, mass enrollment, data centralization and validation and electronic voting.

History

Zetes was founded in 1984 and has grown organically and through acquisitions.

Timeline

1984: Established
 1985: Starts selling Barcode equipment from Symbol Technologies and Zebra Technologies
 1987: Deploys first major system to Colruyt, a large Belgian retailer
 1992: First international expansion: office in France
 1996: Second international expansion: office in Portugal
 1998: Acquisition of Burótica in Portugal.
1999: Kick-off People ID business unit
 2002: Large people ID projects in Belgium: electronic identity card and national health card
 2005: IPO on Euronext Brussels, first international people identification project: enrolment of citizens and issuing of voting cards for DRC (UN contract).
 2006: Acquisition of Powersys, Peak Europe, Vocognition, iDoc and metaform.
 2007: Acquisition of Interscan and MD
 2009: Acquisition of Bopack systems and ImageID
 2010: Acquisition of Phidata BV and 51% of Netwave
 2011: Acquisition of Anvos, Integra, RFidea and Proscan
 2013: Acquisition of InCAPTIO (formerly known as GATC s.r.o.)
 2016: Panasonic acquires 50.95% stake in Zetes Industries
 2017: Panasonic Successfully Completes the Acquisition and De-listing of Zetes Industries SA

Local presence

Zetes has offices in Austria, Belgium, Côte d'Ivoire, Czech Republic, Denmark, Gambia, Germany, Greece, France, Ireland, Israel, Italy, the Netherlands, Poland, Portugal, Senegal, South Africa, Spain, Switzerland and the United Kingdom

References

Companies based in Brussels
Information technology companies of Belgium
1984 establishments in Belgium
